Botro Department is a department of Gbêkê Region in Vallée du Bandama District, Ivory Coast. In 2021, its population was 117,924 and its seat is the settlement of Botro. The sub-prefectures of the department are Botro, Diabo, Krofoinsou, and Languibonou.

History
Botro Department was created in 2008 as a second-level subdivision via a split-off from Bouaké Department. At its creation, it was part of Vallée du Bandama Region.

In 2011, districts were introduced as new first-level subdivisions of Ivory Coast. At the same time, regions were reorganised and became second-level subdivisions and all departments were converted into third-level subdivisions. At this time, Botro Department became part of Gbêkê Region in Vallée du Bandama District.

Notes

Departments of Gbêkê
2008 establishments in Ivory Coast
States and territories established in 2008